Braehead is the name of three villages and hamlets in South Lanarkshire, Scotland.

One is near East Kilbride, at 
One is near Coalburn, at 
One is near Lanark, at

See also
List of places in South Lanarkshire

References

Villages in South Lanarkshire